Kring can refer to:

Places 
 Mount Kring, a nunatak in Oates Land, Antarctica
 Kring Islands, Kemp Land, Antarctica

People 
 Arne Kring (born 1942), Swedish motocross racer of the 1960s and 1970s
 Hilding Kring (1899–1971), Swedish Army lieutenant general
 James B. Kring (1921–1990), American entomologist
 Tim Kring (born 1957), American screenwriter and television producer

Groups 
 De Kring, Artists Society founded at Amsterdam in 1922 
 Kommunisten Kring Breda (marxistisch-leninistisch), a communist group formed in 1972 in Breda, Netherlands
 Koninklijke Oost- en Westvlaamsche Kring, als known as Via-Via, a bilingual (French and Flemish) and nonpolitical student fraternity from Leuven (Belgium) founded in 1922
 Republikeinse Kring, a Belgian cultural trilingual republican association

Other uses 
 8391 Kring, an asteroid
 Kring... Kring..., a 2015 Tamil thriller movie directed by Rahul
 Kring Carpenter Shop, also known as Coffin Shop, a historic commercial building in Gainesville, Sumter County, Alabama
 Kring Point State Park, a 61-acre state park located on the St. Lawrence River in the Town of Alexandria, Jefferson County, New York
 Volvo Kring Føroyar, a road cycling race held in the Faroe Islands

See also
 Krings (surname)
 Cristina Gonzales (born 1976), actress turned politician, nicknamed "Kring-Kring"

sv:Lista över personer i Sagan om Elenien#Kring